The following is a filmography of Vanisri, the Indian actress who acted in Tamil,  Telugu and Kannada films.  She acted predominantly in Telugu films. She has appeared in total 200 films among which 147 were in Telugu, 40 Tamil films, 12 Kannada and one Hindi film.

Telugu filmography

Tamil filmography

Namma Veettu Lakshmi (1966)
Kathal Paduthum Padu (1966)
Thanga Thambi  (1967)
Bhakta Prahlada (1967)
Bhavani (1967)
Kadhalithal Podhuma (1967)
Thamarai Nenjam (1968)
Teacheramma (1968)
Kannan En Kadhalan (1968)
Nervazhi (1968)
Uyarndha Manidhan (1968)
Manasatshi (1969)
Annaiyum Pithavum (1969)
Kuzhandhai Ullam (1969)
Kanni Pen (1969)
Atthai Magal (1969)
Aayiram Poi (1969)
Nirai Kudam (1969)
Porchilai (1969)
Thabalkaran Thangai (1970)
Sangam (1970)
Ethirkalam (1970)
Thalaivan (1970)
Aathi Parasakthi (1971)
Nangu Suvargal (1971)
Kulama Gunama (1971)
Irulum Oliyum (1971)
Velli Vizha (1972)
Vasantha Maligai (1972)
Avasara Kalyanam (1972)
Deiva Kuzhandhaigal (1973)
Sivagamiyin Selvan (1974)
Vani Rani (1974)
Oorukku Uzhaippavan (1976)
Rojavin Raja (1976)
Thaliya Salangaiya (1977)
Ilaya Thalaimurai (1977)
Kanchi Kamakshi (1978)
Punniya Boomi (1978)
Nallathoru Kudumbam (1979)

Kannada filmography

Veera Sankalpa (1964) - Debut film
Muriyada Mane (1964)
Mane Aliya (1964) 
Satya Harishchandra (1965)
Pathala Mohini (1965)
Miss Leelavathi (1965)
Mahasathi Anasuya (1965)
Chandrahasa (1965)
Katari Veera (1966)
Jaanara Jana (1967)
Kasidre Kailasa (1971)
Ganda Mane Makkalu (1988)

Hindi filmography
Kondura (1978)

References

Indian filmographies
Actress filmographies